Catherine Elizabeth Wannan Steel,  (born 31 May 1973) is a British classical scholar. She is Professor of Classics at the University of Glasgow. Steel is an expert on the Roman Republic, the writings of Cicero, and Roman oratory.

She studied in Corpus Christi College, Oxford and was awarded the First Craven scholarship in 1993, and then the Chancellor's Prize for Latin Prose in 1994. She was elected to a Senior Scholarship in 1997.

Steel was elected as a Fellow of the British Academy (FBA) in 2022.

In 2004, she participated in the BBC Radio 4 In Our Time episode on the Roman Republic. She participated in a further episode of In Our Time, in January 2018, on Cicero. Her book Cicero, Rhetoric and Empire is held in 1062 libraries worldwide.

Selected publications
Community and Communication: Oratory and Politics in Republican Rome. Oxford University Press, 2013. (Edited with Henriette van der Blom) 
The Cambridge Companion to Cicero (Cambridge: Cambridge University Press, 2013)

The End of the Roman Republic, 146-44 B.C.: Conquest and Crisis. Series: Edinburgh history of Ancient Rome, 3. Edinburgh University Press: Edinburgh, 2013. 
Roman Oratory. Series: New surveys in the classics. Cambridge University Press, 2006. 
Reading Cicero: Genre and Performance in Late Republican Rome, 2005. Duckworth. 
Cicero, Rhetoric and Empire. Oxford University Press, 2002.

External links 
 University of Glasgow profile page

References 

1973 births
Living people
Academics of the University of Glasgow
Alumni of Corpus Christi College, Oxford
Fellows of the British Academy
British classical scholars
Women classical scholars
Historians of ancient Rome